Peperomia marmorata is a species of plant in the genus Peperomia native to Brazil.

References

marmorata
Flora of Brazil